Ryan James Schultz (born July 4, 1977) is an American mixed martial artist who last competed in 2013. A professional since 2003, he has competed in the WEC, IFL, and Japan's World Victory Road. He was the last International Fight League Lightweight Champion, competing for Matt Lindland's Portland Wolfpack.

Biography
Schultz was born and raised in North Platte, Nebraska. He was a member of his high school wrestling team, graduating in 1996. Schultz has a degree in criminal justice from the University of Nebraska, where he continued to compete in wrestling, coached by Matt Lindland. After graduation, Ryan worked as an apprentice plumber in Colorado, before embarking on his MMA career. Schultz is a member of Team Quest, training with his former wrestling coach and former UFC veteran Matt Lindland.

Mixed martial arts career

Early career
Schultz was entered into his first MMA fight by a friend. The fight took place at Dan Severn's promotion Dangerzone, in April 2004, in North Dakota. Schultz had not trained at all for the fight, but won by KO, after just 45 seconds. A few days after the fight, Lindland asked Schultz to join Team Quest, an offer which Schultz accepted. Over the next three years, Schultz competed in 20 fights in various promotions, including the WEC, Hawaiian promotion SuperBrawl, Absolute Fighting Championship, and SportFight - a promotion founded by Matt Lindland and Randy Couture.

On June 18, 2004, Schultz won an eight-man lightweight tournament, at SuperBrawl 36 in Hawaii. Schultz won his first fight that night, against Mike Aina, by a split decision. In the semi-final fight, Schultz submitted Deshaun Johnson by a rear-naked choke in the first round. In the finals, Schultz defeated Roger Huerta, who verbally submitted due to a dislocated jaw.

International Fight League
Ryan Schultz entered the IFL promotion as a member of the Portland Wolfpack team, with a record of 13–7–1. He defeated Cam Ward by TKO in his first fight in the promotion, but lost to Los Angeles Anacondas' Chris Horodecki in his second fight, two months later. In his third fight, on December 29, 2006, he faced Quad Cities Silverbacks' future UFC veteran Bart Palaszewski. Schultz dominated the first and second round of the fight, but got caught by Palaszewski's right hand in the third round, and lost by KO. The match was awarded "Fight of the Night" honors.

After winning his next three bouts in the IFL, Schultz was selected to replace John Gunderson (himself a replacement for Shad Lierley) in a fight against Chris Horodecki for the IFL lightweight championship. In the bout, which took place at the IFL: World Grand Prix Finals, Schultz was able to avenged his first loss to Horodecki in the IFL. Schultz pinned Horodecki's right hand early in the first round, continued to pound him until the referee stepped in at 2:51 of the first round, and was crowned the first IFL Lightweight Champion.

Before the IFL promotion folded, Schultz successfully defended his title twice, defeating John Gunderson and Deividas Taurosevicius, both by unanimous decision.

World Victory Road - Sengoku
In July 2008, Schultz agreed to a five event deal with the Japanese promotion Sengoku. In his first fight for the promotion, at Sengoku IV, Schultz lost to Mizuto Hirota, by KO in the second round. Schultz faced  Jorge Masvidal in his next fight, which took place less than a month after Sengoku IV. Masvidal was able to knockdown Schultz in the first round, and finished him by TKO using strikes on his grounded opponent.

Personal life
Ryan married his high school sweetheart and together they have a son. Ryan and his family live in Fort Collins, Colorado.  
Schultz and fellow MMA fighter Ed Herman own and operate "Trials Martial Arts and Fitness Gym" in Northern Colorado. The gym offers high level mixed martial arts training.

Ryan is featured in the mixed martial arts documentary Fight Life, released in 2013, the film is directed by independent filmmaker James Z. Feng and produced by RiLL Films.

Championships and accomplishments
International Fight League
IFL Lightweight Championship (One time; First; Last)

Mixed martial arts record

|-
| Loss
| align=center| 23–14–1
| Anselmo Luna
| TKO (punches)
| Prize Fighting Championship 3
| 
| align=center| 2
| align=center| 3:05
| Midland, Texas United States
| 
|-
| Loss
| align=center| 23–13–1
| Scott Cleve
| KO (punches)
| SCL: Rise of the King
| 
| align=center| 1
| align=center| 3:04
| Denver, Colorado United States
| 
|-
| Win
| align=center| 23–12–1
| Billy Martin
| Submission (rear-naked choke)
| MFP: Resurrection
| 
| align=center| 1
| align=center| 2:49
| Casper, Wyoming United States
| 
|-
| Win
| align=center| 22–12–1
| Angelo Duarte
| Submission (rear-naked choke)
| ROF 42
| 
| align=center| 1
| align=center| 2:37
| Broomfield, Colorado United States
| 
|-
| Loss
| align=center| 21–12–1
| Kazunori Yokota
| KO (punches)
| World Victory Road Presents: Sengoku 10
| 
| align=center| 1
| align=center| 2:37
| Saitama, Japan
| 
|-
| Loss
| align=center| 21–11–1
| Jorge Masvidal
| TKO (punches)
| World Victory Road Presents: Sengoku 5
| 
| align=center| 1
| align=center| 1:57
| Tokyo, Japan
| 
|-
| Loss
| align=center| 
| Mizuto Hirota
| KO (superman punch)
| World Victory Road Presents: Sengoku 4
| 
| align=center| 2
| align=center| 4:25
| Saitama, Japan
| 
|-
| Win
| align=center| 21–9–1
| Deividas Taurosevicius
| Decision (unanimous)
| IFL: Connecticut
| 
| align=center| 5
| align=center| 4:00
| Uncasville, Connecticut, United States
| 
|-
| Win
| align=center| 20–9–1
| John Gunderson
| Decision (unanimous)
| IFL: Las Vegas
| 
| align=center| 5
| align=center| 4:00
| Las Vegas, Nevada, United States
| 
|-
| Win
| align=center| 19–9–1
| Chris Horodecki 
| TKO (punches)
| IFL: World Grand Prix Finals
| 
| align=center| 1
| align=center| 2:51
| Uncasville, Connecticut, United States
| 
|-
| Win
| align=center| 18–9–1
| Aaron Riley
| Decision (unanimous)
| IFL: 2007 Team Championship Final
| 
| align=center| 3
| align=center| 4:00
| Hollywood, Florida, United States
| 
|-
| Win
| align=center| 17–9–1
| Savant Young
| Decision (unanimous)
| IFL: Everett
| 
| align=center| 3
| align=center| 4:00
| Everett, Washington, United States
| 
|-
| Win
| align=center| 16–9–1
| Joe Sampieri
| Decision (unanimous)
| IFL: Connecticut
| 
| align=center| 3
| align=center| 4:00
| Uncasville, Connecticut, United States
| 
|-
| Loss
| align=center| 15–9–1
| Bart Palaszewski
| KO (punch)
| IFL: Championship Final
| 
| align=center| 3
| align=center| 2:16
| Uncasville, Connecticut, United States
| 
|-
| Loss
| align=center| 15–8–1
| Chris Horodecki
| TKO (head kick and punches)
| IFL: World Championship Semifinals
| 
| align=center| 2
| align=center| 0:24
| Uncasville, Connecticut, United States
| 
|-
| Win
| align=center| 15–7–1
| Cam Ward
| TKO (punches)
| IFL: Portland
| 
| align=center| 2
| align=center| 2:38
| Portland, Oregon, United States
| 
|-
| Loss
| align=center| 14–7–1
| Hermes França
| KO (punches)
| AFC 16: Absolute Fighting Championships 16
| 
| align=center| 1
| align=center| 3:30
| Boca Raton, Florida, United States
| 
|-
| Win
| align=center| 14–6–1
| Dave Cochran
| Submission (rear-naked choke)
| SF 15: Tribute
| 
| align=center| 1
| align=center| 3:42
| Portland, Oregon, United States
| 
|-
| Loss
| align=center| 13–6–1
| Kuniyoshi Hironaka
| Submission (armbar)
| MARS: MARS
| 
| align=center| 2
| align=center| 1:40
| Tokyo, Japan
| 
|-
| Loss
| align=center| 13–5–1
| Rich Clementi
| Submission (armbar)
| AFC 14: Absolute Fighting Championships 14
| 
| align=center| 1
| align=center| 3:39
| Fort Lauderdale, Florida, United States
| 
|-
| Loss
| align=center| 13–4–1
| David Gardner
| Submission (broken rib)
| FFC 15: Fiesta Las Vegas
| 
| align=center| 1
| align=center| 1:00
| Las Vegas, Nevada, United States
| 
|-
| Draw
| align=center| 13–3–1
| Gesias Cavalcante
| Draw
| SF 11: Rumble at the Rose Garden
| 
| align=center| 3
| align=center| 5:00
| Portland, Oregon, United States
| 
|-
| Win
| align=center| 13–3
| Hiroyuki Abe
| TKO (punches)
| Euphoria: USA vs World
| 
| align=center| 2
| align=center| 0:42
| Atlantic City, New Jersey, United States
| 
|-
| Loss
| align=center| 12–3
| Keith Wilson
| Decision (unanimous)
| SF 8: Justice
| 
| align=center| 3
| align=center| 5:00
| Gresham, Oregon, United States
| 
|-
| Win
| align=center| 12–2
| David Gaona
| TKO (punches)
| Euphoria: Road to the Titles
| 
| align=center| 1
| align=center| 2:17
| Atlantic City, New Jersey, United States
| 
|-
| Win
| align=center| 11–2
| Jason Dent
| TKO (punches)
| APEX: Genesis
| 
| align=center| 1
| align=center| 2:00
| Montreal, Quebec, Canada
| 
|-
| Win
| align=center| 10–2
| Roger Huerta
| TKO (jaw injury)
| SB 36: SuperBrawl 36
| 
| align=center| 1
| align=center| 1:47
| Honolulu, Hawaii, United States
| 
|-
| Win
| align=center| 9–2
| Deshaun Johnson
| Submission (rear-naked choke)
| SB 36: SuperBrawl 36
| 
| align=center| 1
| align=center| 2:55
| Honolulu, Hawaii, United States
| 
|-
| Win
| align=center| 8–2
| Mike Aina
| Decision (split)
| SB 36: SuperBrawl 36
| 
| align=center| 3
| align=center| 3:00
| Honolulu, Hawaii, United States
| 
|-
| Win
| align=center| 7–2
| Gil Castillo
| Decision (majority)
| WEC 10
| 
| align=center| 3
| align=center| 5:00
| Lemoore, California, United States
| 
|-
| Loss
| align=center| 6–2
| Ronald Jhun
| TKO (corner stoppage)
| ROTR 5: Rumble on the Rock 5
| 
| align=center| 2
| align=center| 5:00
| Honolulu, Hawaii, United States
| 
|-
| Win
| align=center| 6–1
| Nick Gilardi
| KO (punches)
| DB 10: DesertBrawl 10
| 
| align=center| 1
| align=center| N/A
| Bend, Oregon, United States
| 
|-
| Win
| align=center| 5–1
| Eddy Ellis
| KO (punch)
| SF 1: Revolution
| 
| align=center| 1
| align=center| 1:53
| Portland, Oregon, United States
| 
|-
| Win
| align=center| 4–1
| Hank Weis
| TKO (submission to punches)
| KC 8: Kickdown Classic 8
| 
| align=center| 1
| align=center| 2:17
| Denver, Colorado, United States
| 
|-
| Win
| align=center| 3–1
| Jeremy Saunders
| TKO (punches)
| URC 6: Ultimate Ring Challenge 6
| 
| align=center| 1
| align=center| 0:46
| Longview, Washington, United States
| 
|-
| Win
| align=center| 2–1
| Hannibal Adofo
| KO (punch)
| WEC 8
| 
| align=center| 1
| align=center| 0:25
| Lemoore, California, United States
| 
|-
| Loss
| align=center| 1–1
| JT Taylor
| KO (punches)
| WEC 7
| 
| align=center| 2
| align=center| 1:56
| Lemoore, California, United States
| 
|-
| Win
| align=center| 1–0
| Jon Henderson
| TKO (punches)
| Dangerzone: Dakota Destruction
| 
| align=center| 1
| align=center| 0:45
| New Town, North Dakota, United States
|

See also
List of male mixed martial artists

References

External links
 
 Northern Colorado's Premier MMA Gym

Living people
1977 births
American male mixed martial artists
Mixed martial artists from Nebraska
Lightweight mixed martial artists
Mixed martial artists utilizing collegiate wrestling
Mixed martial artists utilizing Brazilian jiu-jitsu
Sportspeople from Portland, Oregon
People from North Platte, Nebraska
American male sport wrestlers
Amateur wrestlers
American practitioners of Brazilian jiu-jitsu
People awarded a black belt in Brazilian jiu-jitsu